Alexander Mar Thoma XIX Metropolitan (10 April 1912 – 11 January 2000) was the Metropolitan of the Malankara Mar Thoma Syrian Church with its center in Kerala state in south-western India.

Early life

Family 
In the state of Kerala, India, on the banks of river Pamba, surrounded by the villages Maramon, Ayroor, Thadiyoor, Pullad is the village of Kuriannoor.  The Maliackel family was one of the well-known families here.   A member of this family, Rev. M.C.George (Rev. Maliackel Chandy George) was a vicar of the Mar Thoma parish in Kuriannoor. His son Kunjachen ( Alexander Mar Thoma) was born on 10 April 1912. His mother was Mariamma of Maramon, Anjilivelil family. The baby was baptized by Rev. A.V.Mathew, at the Maramon church and was given the name Maliackel George Chandy.

Education
He began his schooling at the age of four. In 1922, when he was ten years old, his father died. Kunjachen was sent to a nearby High School at Kozhencherry.
 
He continued his studies at Maharajas College, Ernakulam and at Union Christian College, Aluva. A year after finishing he was able to secure a teaching post at C.M.S.High school, Kottayam, where he taught mathematics for 12 years. While there he began to take part in social activities.

Ordination
To further his studies, he was making arrangements to go to Agra, when he was called by Dr.Abraham Mar Thoma Metropolitan to join the ministry. He accepted the offer and in 1945 joined United Theological College, Bangalore.
On 7 June 1946, he was ordained as clergy. He returned to Bangalore and in addition to his studies, was also the Assistant vicar to the Mar Thoma parish.

In 1948 he completed the course and was offered admission at Union Theological College, New York. He was able to obtain S.T.M. (Master of Systematic Theology). In 1949 he was at Hartford Seminary Foundation for his Ph.D. He received his Ph.D. in 1951. The title of his thesis was, "Viśvarūpa Darśana: a study of the vision of God in the Bhagavadgītā".

After returning to India in 1951, he was appointed as the vicar of Manganam (near Kottayam) Marthoma church for about a year.

Mar Thoma Church opened a College for higher education at Tiruvalla in 1952; Rev. M. G. Chandy was appointed as its first principal.

Consecration

Episcopa
The church Mandalam (representative assembly) realized the need for three more bishops. Rev. M. G. Chandy was one of those who were selected to be a bishop. On 23 May 1953, Juhanon Mar Thoma Metropolitan assisted by Mathews Mar Athanasius Episcopa ordained Rev. M. G. Chandy to the episcopate and was given the episcopal title, Alexander Mar Theophilus. P. Thomas (Thomas Mar Athanasius) and Philip Oommen (Philipose Mar Chrysostom) were ordained on the same day.

Suffragan Metropolitan
He was ordained as a suffragan in 1974 and was given the title Alexander Mar Theophilus Suffragan Metropolitan.

Metropolitan

Malankara throne

After the great swearing-in 1653, it became necessary to appoint a bishop. For this purpose, a special chair was made and Mar Thoma I the first bishop of Malankara church was enthroned. This throne, used for the consecration of Mar Thoma I, is in the possession of the Mar Thoma Church and is kept at Tiruvalla, It has been used in the installation of every Mar Thoma Metropolitan, to this day, so that the continuity of the throne of Mar Thoma is ensured. This was the throne used for the consecration of Mar Thoma XIX, Dr. Alexander Mar Thoma Metropolitan in the year 1976.

Enthronement
Juhanon Mar Thoma Metropolitan died in September 1976. Being the senior bishop, Alexander Mar Theophilus Suffragan Metropolitan was enthroned as the next Metropolitan on 23 October 1976 at Kottayam and was given the name Alexander Mar Thoma Metropolitan.

Developmental projects
For the development of underdeveloped villages and for the low-income group, the Metropolitan took interest to begin a number of development projects. They included CARD (Christian Agency for Rural Development); STARD South Travancore Agency for Rural Development); for ladies SVS (Sthree Jena Vikasana Samithi) and MCRD (Marthoma Centre for Rehabilitation and Development).  For backward children Nava Jyothi school and for hill tribes, Giri Deepthi school were established.

Ecumenical relations
During this period a number of Marthomites settled in various parts of India and began to emigrate to other countries. This made it necessary to get the assistance of various established churches in those areas. For this, Mar Thoma church came into close relation with suitable churches in various parts of India and around the world.

Mar Thoma Church is an active member of the World Council of Churches.
Mar Thoma Church, Church of South India and Church of North India formed a joint council in 1978. 
Came into full communion with the Anglican communion. So in 1980 he attended the enthronement of Robert Runcie as Archbishop of Canterbury, and in 1984 attended its consultative council in Nairobi.

Last days
By 1999, his health deteriorated and he wished to pass on his responsibilities to his successor. So, according to the decision of church Mandalam (representative assembly), he was elevated to the position of Valia Thirumeni (senior Metropolitan) on 23 November 1999 and the responsibilities of the church were given to his successor Philipose Mar Chrysostom Suffragan Metropolitan. Alexander Mar Thoma was the first Valia Thirumeni of the church.
 
He died on 11 January 2000 and was interred in the Bishops' cemetery in the SCS Compound, Tiruvalla.

See also
 Throne of St. Thomas
 List of Malankara Metropolitans
 Syrian Malabar Nasrani
 Saint Thomas Christians
 Christianity in India
 List of Catholicoi of the East and Malankara Metropolitans
 List of Syrian Malabar Nasranis

References

Further reading
Dr. Alexander Marthoma Metropolitan. (1985) The Mar Thoma Church – Heritage and Mission.
Dr. Alexander Marthoma Metropolitan. (1998). Deiva Kripayude Thanalil (In the shadow of the grace of God).
Juhanon Marthoma Metropolitan, The Most Rev. Dr. (1952). Christianity in India and a Brief History of the Marthoma Syrian Church. Pub: K.M. Cherian.
Zac Varghese Dr. & Mathew A. Kallumpram. (2003). Glimpses of Mar Thoma Church History. London, England. .
Chacko, T. C. (1936) Malankara Marthoma Sabha Charithra Samgraham (Concise History of Marthoma Church). Pub: E.J. Institute, Kompady, Tiruvalla.
Eapen, Prof. Dr. K. V. (2001). Malankara Marthoma Suryani Sabha Charitram (History of Malankara Marthoma Syrian Church). Pub: Kallettu, Muttambalam, Kottayam.
Mathew, N. M. Malankara Marthoma Sabha Charitram (History of the Marthoma Church), Volume 1 (2006), Volume II (2007), Volume III (2008). Pub. E.J.Institute, Thiruvalla.
Valia Metropolitan (Malayalam) Published by Mar Thoma Sabha Publication (2001).

External links
 

People from Pathanamthitta district
Saint Thomas Christians
Alexander
1912 births
2000 deaths
Christian clergy from Kerala